The 2016 Pittsburgh Pirates season was the franchise's 135th season overall, the  130th season as a member of the National League, and the 16th season at PNC Park. The regular season started with a win at home against the St. Louis Cardinals on April 3 and ended with a loss to the Cardinals at Busch Stadium on October 2. The Pirates finished the regular season third in the National League Central Division with 78 wins and 83 losses. For the first time since the 2012 season, the Pirates finished with a losing record and did not qualify for the postseason.

Two members of the 2016 Pirates were selected to represent the National League in the All-Star Game: pitcher Mark Melancon and outfielder Starling Marte. In addition, two players were named NL Player of the Week: infielder Jung-ho Kang and utility player Sean Rodriguez, both in September.

Season standings

National League Central

National League playoff standings

Record vs. opponents

Detailed records

Regular season

April
April 3 – The Pirates defeat the St. Louis Cardinals in the very first game of the 2016 Major League Baseball season
April 6 – The Pirates sweep the Cardinals in the first series of the regular season.
The Pirates finish the month with a win–loss record of 15–9, second in the NL Central at 3.0 games out of first.

May
May 6 – Third baseman/Shortstop Jung-ho Kang returns from a 2015 season-ending injury to make his 2016 season debut, hitting two home runs in a 4–2 win over the St. Louis Cardinals.
May 20 – Andrew McCutchen records his 613th career hit at PNC Park, surpassing Jack Wilson as PNC Park hits leader.
May 23 – Starting pitcher Ryan Vogelsong is hit by a pitch while batting. Reliever Wilfredo Boscán takes his place four days after his MLB debut and records his first career MLB win and hit.
May 26 – The Pirates conclude a ten-game homestand, winning eight and taking three series in a row against the Atlanta Braves, Colorado Rockies and Arizona Diamondbacks.
May 30 – Pitcher Jeff Locke pitches the first complete game shutout of his career, in 105 pitches, in a 10–0 victory against the Miami Marlins. Outfielder Gregory Polanco hits the first grand slam of his career.
The Pirates finish the month with a win–loss record of 29–22, second in the NL Central at 6.5 games out of first.

June
June 7 – After rain forces the first game in a homestand against the New York Mets on June 6 to be postponed, the Pirates sweep a double-header against the Mets. Closing pitcher Mark Melancon records a save in both games.
June 8 – Starting pitcher Jameson Taillon makes his MLB debut against the New York Mets, striking out three and allowing three runs in six innings in a loss to the Mets.
June 14 – Jameson Taillon earns his first career MLB win in a shutout victory over the New York Mets.
June 17 – The Pirates are shut out for the first time in the 2016 season in a loss against the Chicago Cubs.
June 24 – Clint Hurdle earns his 1000th career win as a manager in a Pirates victory at home over the Los Angeles Dodgers.
The Pirates finish the month with a win–loss record of 38–41, third in the NL Central at 14.0 games out of first.

July
July 4 – Juan Nicasio becomes only the 74th player to pitch an immaculate inning in a Major League game.
July 5 – Mark Melancon (P) is named to the National League All-Star team, while Starling Marte (LF) is named a final vote candidate.
July 7 – Starting pitcher Tyler Glasnow makes his MLB debut, striking out five and allowing four runs in a loss against the St. Louis Cardinals.
July 10 – The Pirates enter the All-Star break with a win–loss record of 46–43, third in the NL Central.
July 17 – The Pirates defeat the Washington Nationals 2–1 in 18 innings, the longest regular season game in Nationals history, on the strength of a Starling Marte home run.
July 27 – Pitcher Gerrit Cole pitches the first complete game of his career, in 93 pitches, in a 10–1 victory against the Seattle Mariners.
July 30 – The Pirates trade closing pitcher Mark Melancon to the Washington Nationals for Felipe Rivero and Taylor Hearn; Tony Watson replaces Melancon as closer.
The Pirates finish the month with a win–loss record of 52–51, third in the NL Central at 10.5 games out of first.

August
The Pirates finish the month with a win–loss record of 67–64, third in the NL Central at 17.5 games out of first.

September
September 12 – Jung-ho Kang is named NL Player of the Week for the week ending September 11.
September 19 – Sean Rodriguez is named NL co-Player of the Week for the week ending September 18.
September 27 – The Pirates lose to the Chicago Cubs and are prevented from qualifying for the postseason for the first time since 2012.
September 29 – The Pirates and the Cubs tie, 1–1, after the game was called in the 6th inning because of inclement weather. The game was not made up as the result did not impact the playoff race. It was the first tie in MLB since June 2005.
September 30 – The Pirates lose for the 81st time of the season, against the Cardinals, ensuring the team's first losing season since 2012.
The Pirates finish the month with a win–loss record of 78–81, third in the NL Central at 24.0 games out of first.

October
October 2 – At the conclusion of the season, the Pirates had a win–loss record of 78–83, finishing third in the NL Central behind the St. Louis Cardinals and the Chicago Cubs.

Game log

|- bgcolor="ccffcc"
| 1 || April 3 || Cardinals || 4–1 || Liriano (1–0) || Wainwright (0–1) || — || 39,500 || 1–0 ||W1
|- bgcolor="ccffcc"
| 2 || April 5 || Cardinals || 6–5 (11) || Lobstein (1–0) || Maness (0–1) || — || 26,049 || 2–0 ||W2
|-  bgcolor="ccffcc"
| 3 || April 6 || Cardinals || 5–1 || Nicasio (1–0) || Leake (0–1) || Melancon (1) || 14,890 || 3–0 ||W3
|- bgcolor="ccffcc"
| 4 || April 8 || @ Reds || 6–5 || Vogelsong (1–0) || Hoover (0–1) || Melancon (2) || 17,194 || 4–0 ||W4
|- bgcolor="ffbbbb"
| 5 || April 9 || @ Reds || 1–5 || Iglesias (1–0) || Cole (0–1) || — || 22,799 || 4–1 ||L1
|- bgcolor="ffbbbb"
| 6 || April 10 || @ Reds || 1–2 || Ohlendorf (2–0) || Caminero (0–1) || — || 27,207 || 4–2 ||L2
|- bgcolor="ccffcc"
| 7 || April 11 || @ Tigers || 7–4 || Niese (1–0) || Verlander (0–1) || Melancon (3) || 26,271 || 5–2 ||W1
|- bgcolor="ffbbbb"
| 8 || April 12 || @ Tigers || 2–8 || Sánchez (2–0) || Nicasio (1–1) || — || 26,489 || 5–3 ||L1
|- bgcolor="ffbbbb"
| 9 || April 13 || Tigers || 3–7 || Greene (1–0)|| Caminero (0–2)|| — ||21,175|| 5–4 ||L2
|- bgcolor="ffbbbb"
| 10 || April 14 || Tigers || 4–7 || Zimmermann (2–0) || Cole (0–2) || Rodríguez (2) || 18,751 || 5–5 ||L3
|- bgcolor="ffbbbb"
| 11 || April 15 || Brewers || 4–8 || Nelson (2–1) || Locke (0–1) || — || 24,280 || 5–6 ||L4
|- bgcolor="ccffcc"
| 12 || April 16 || Brewers || 5–0 || Niese (2–0) || Jungmann (0–2) || — || 34,957 || 6–6 ||W1
|- bgcolor="ccffcc"
| 13 || April 17 || Brewers || 9–3 || Nicasio (2–1) || Davies (0–1) || — || 31,124 || 7–6 ||W2
|- bgcolor="ffbbbb"
| 14 || April 19 || @ Padres || 4–5 || Rea (1–1) || Liriano (1–1) || Rodney (2) || 19,449 || 7–7 ||L1
|- bgcolor="ffbbbb"
| 15 || April 20 || @ Padres || 2–8 || Pomeranz (2–1) || Locke (0–2) || — || 20,681 || 7–8 ||L2
|- bgcolor="ccffcc"
| 16 || April 21 || @ Padres || 11–1 || Cole (1–2) || Shields (0–3) || — || 20,387 || 8–8 ||W1
|- bgcolor="ccffcc"
| 17 || April 22 || @ Diamondbacks || 8–7 || Niese (3–0) || Corbin (1–2) || Melancon (4) || 27,829 || 9–8 ||W2
|- bgcolor="ffbbbb"
| 18 || April 23 || @ Diamondbacks || 1–7 || De La Rosa (2–3) || Nicasio (2–2) || — || 32,935 || 9–9 ||L1
|- bgcolor="ccffcc"
| 19 || April 24 || @ Diamondbacks || 12–10 (13) || Feliz (1–0) || Marshall (0–1) || Caminero (1) || 27,573 || 10–9 ||W1
|- bgcolor="ccffcc"
| 20 || April 25 || @ Rockies || 6–1 || Locke (1–2) || Bettis (2–1) || Schugel (1) || 20,674 || 11–9 ||W2
|- bgcolor="ccffcc"
| 21 || April 26 || @ Rockies || 9–4 || Cole (2–2) || De La Rosa (1–3) || — || 20,227 || 12–9 ||W3
|- bgcolor="ccffcc"
| 22 || April 27 || @ Rockies || 9–8 (12) || Lobstein (2–0) || Estévez (0–1) || Melancon (5) || 21,345 || 13–9 ||W4
|- style="text-align:center; background:#bbb;"
| — || April 28 || @ Rockies ||colspan=7| PPD, RAIN/SNOW; rescheduled for June 9
|- bgcolor="ccffcc"
| 23 || April 29 || Reds || 4–1 || Nicasio (3–2) || Straily (0–1) || Melancon (6) || 29,938 || 14–9 ||W5
|- bgcolor="ccffcc"
| 24 || April 30 || Reds || 5–1 || Liriano (2–1) || Simón (0–3) || Melancon (7) || 34,810 || 15–9 ||W6
|-

|- bgcolor="ffbbbb"
| 25 || May 1 || Reds || 5–6 (11) || Wood (3–0) || Vogelsong (1–1) || — || 28,755 || 15–10 ||L1
|- bgcolor="ffbbbb"
| 26 || May 2 || Cubs || 2–7 || Hammel (4–0) || Cole (2–3) || — || 18,376 || 15–11 ||L2
|- bgcolor="ffbbbb"
| 27 || May 3 || Cubs || 1–7 || Arrieta (6–0) || Niese (3–1) || — || 22,195 || 15–12 ||L3
|- bgcolor="ffbbbb"
| 28 || May 4 || Cubs || 2–6 || Lester (3–1) || Nicasio (3–3) || — || 28,782 || 15–13 ||L4
|- bgcolor="ccffcc"
| 29 || May 6 || @ Cardinals || 4–2 || Liriano (3–1) || Martínez (4–2) || Melancon (8) || 43,093 || 16–13 ||W1
|- bgcolor="ffbbbb"
| 30 || May 7 || @ Cardinals || 4–6 || Rosenthal (1–1) || Schugel (0–1) || — || 42,338 || 16–14 ||L1
|- bgcolor="ccffcc"
| 31 || May 8 || @ Cardinals || 10–5 || Cole (3–3) || Wacha (2–3) || Melancon (9) || 42,441 || 17–14 ||W1
|- bgcolor="ffbbbb"
| 32 || May 9 || @ Reds || 2–3 || Ramirez (1–2) || Niese (3–2) || Cingrani (2) || 12,103 || 17–15 ||L1
|- style="text-align:center; background:#bbb;"
| — || May 10 || @ Reds ||colspan=7| PPD, RAIN; rescheduled for September 17
|- bgcolor="ccffcc"
| 33 || May 11 || @ Reds || 5–4 || Watson (1–0) || Ohlendorf (3–4) || Melancon (10) || 14,694 || 18–15 ||W1
|- bgcolor="ffbbbb"
| 34 || May 13 || @ Cubs || 4–9 || Hammel (5–0) || Liriano (3–2) || — || 37,479 || 18–16 ||L1
|- bgcolor="ffbbbb"
| 35 || May 14 || @ Cubs || 2–8 || Arrieta (7–0) || Locke (1–3) || — || 40,953 || 18–17 ||L2
|- bgcolor="ccffcc"
| 36 || May 15 || @ Cubs || 2–1 || Cole (4–3) || Lester (4–2) || Melancon (11) || 40,814 || 19–17 ||W1
|- bgcolor="ccffcc"
| 37 || May 16 || Braves || 8–5 || Niese (4–2) || Pérez (1–1) || Melancon (12) || 16,905 || 20–17 ||W2
|- bgcolor="ccffcc"
| 38 || May 17 || Braves || 12–9 || Nicasio (4–3) || Blair (0–3) || Melancon (13) || 19,400 || 21–17 ||W3
|- bgcolor="ffbbbb"
| 39 || May 18 || Braves || 1–3 || Teherán (1–4) || Liriano (3–3) || Vizcaíno (4) || 18,201 || 21–18 ||L1
|- bgcolor="ccffcc"
| 40 || May 19 || Braves || 8–2 || Locke (2–3) || Foltynewicz (1–2) || — || 23,074 || 22–18 ||W1
|- bgcolor="ccffcc"
| 41 || May 20 || Rockies || 2–1 || Cole (5–3) || Butler (2–2) || Melancon (14) || 23,248 || 23–18 ||W2
|- bgcolor="ffbbbb"
| 42 || May 21 || Rockies || 1–5 || Estevez (1–1) || Melancon (0–1) || — || 31,352 || 23–19 ||L1
|- style="text-align:center; background:#bbb;"
| — || May 22 || Rockies ||colspan=7| PPD, RAIN; rescheduled for May 23
|- bgcolor="ccffcc"
| 43 || May 23 || Rockies || 6–3 || Boscán (1–0) || Lyles (1–2) || Melancon (15) || 34,529 || 24–19 ||W1
|- bgcolor="ccffcc"
| 44 || May 24 || Diamondbacks || 12–1 || Liriano (4–3) || Miller (1–6) || — || 18,415 || 25–19 ||W2
|- bgcolor="ccffcc"
| 45 || May 25 || Diamondbacks || 5–4 || Locke (3–3) || De La Rosa (4–5) || Melancon (16) || 20,696 || 26–19 ||W3
|- bgcolor="ccffcc"
| 46 || May 26 || Diamondbacks || 8–3 || Schugel (1–1) || Corbin (2–4) || — || 30,861 || 27–19 ||W4
|- bgcolor="ccffcc"
| 47 || May 27 || @ Rangers || 9–1 || Niese (5–2) || Hamels (5–1) || — || 37,645 || 28–19 ||W5
|- bgcolor="ffbbbb"
| 48 || May 28 || @ Rangers || 2–5 || Darvish (1–0) || Nicasio (4–4) || — || 46,950 || 28–20 ||L1
|- bgcolor="ffbbbb"
| 49 || May 29 || @ Rangers || 2–6 || Perez (3–4) || Liriano (4–4) || — || 44,613 || 28–21 ||L2
|- bgcolor="ccffcc"
| 50 || May 30 || @ Marlins || 10–0 || Locke (4–3) || Nicolino (2–3) || — || 10,856 || 29–21 ||W1
|- bgcolor="ffbbbb"
| 51 || May 31 || @ Marlins || 1–3 || Fernandez (8–2) || Cole (5–4) || Ramos (16) || 10,637 || 29–22 ||L1
|-

|- bgcolor="ffbbbb"
| 52 || June 1 || @ Marlins || 2–3 || Phelps (4–3) || Watson (1–1) || Ramos (17) || 17,018 || 29–23 ||L2
|- bgcolor="ffbbbb"
| 53 || June 2 || @ Marlins || 3–4 (12) || Wittgren (1–0) || Schugel (1–2) || — || 19,907 || 29–24 ||L3
|- bgcolor="ffbbbb"
| 54 || June 3 || Angels || 2–9 || Weaver (5–4) || Liriano (4–5) || — || 27,643 || 29–25 ||L4
|- bgcolor="ccffcc"
| 55 || June 4 || Angels || 8–7 || Locke (5–3) || Salas (2–2) || Melancon (17) || 31,505 || 30–25 ||W1
|- bgcolor="ffbbbb"
| 56 || June 5 || Angels || 4–5 || Guerra (1–0) || Watson (1–2) || Street (6) || 27,754 || 30–26 ||L1
|- style="text-align:center; background:#bbb;"
| — || June 6 || Mets ||colspan=7| PPD, RAIN; rescheduled for June 7
|- bgcolor="ccffcc"
| 57 || June 7 || Mets || 3–1 || Niese (6–2) || Matz (7–2) || Melancon (18) || N/A || 31–26 ||W1
|- bgcolor="ccffcc"
| 58 || June 7 || Mets || 3–1 || Nicasio (5–4) || deGrom (3–2) || Melancon (19) || 26,605 || 32–26 ||W2
|- bgcolor="ffbbbb"
| 59 || June 8 || Mets || 5–6 || Reed (1–0) || Luebke (0–1) || Familia (19) || 28,084 || 32–27 ||L1
|- bgcolor="ffbbbb"
| 60 || June 9 || @ Rockies || 5–11 || De La Rosa (2–4) || Locke (5–4) || — || 24,678 || 32–28 ||L2
|- bgcolor="ffbbbb"
| 61 || June 10 || Cardinals || 3–9 (12) || Broxton (1–0) || Nicasio (5–5) || — || 28,417 || 32–29 ||L3
|- bgcolor="ffbbbb"
| 62 || June 11 || Cardinals || 1–5 || Martinez (7–5) || Liriano (4–6) || Rosenthal (12) || 36,962 || 32–30 ||L4
|- bgcolor="ffbbbb"
| 63 || June 12 || Cardinals || 3–8 || Leake (5–4) || Niese (6–3) || — || 31,148 || 32–31 ||L5
|- bgcolor="ccffcc"
| 64 || June 14 || @ Mets || 4–0 || Taillon (1–0) || deGrom (3–3) || — || 35,124 || 33–31 ||W1
|- bgcolor="ffbbbb"
| 65 || June 15 || @ Mets || 2–11 || Syndergaard (7–2) || Locke (5–5) || — || 32,117 || 33–32 ||L1
|- bgcolor="ffbbbb"
| 66 || June 16 || @ Mets || 4–6 || Colón (6–3) || Nicasio (5–6) || Familia (22) || 33,052 || 33–33 ||L2
|- bgcolor="ffbbbb"
| 67 || June 17 || @ Cubs || 0–6 || Arrieta (11–1) || Liriano (4–7) || — || 41,547 || 33–34 ||L3
|- bgcolor="ffbbbb"
| 68 || June 18 || @ Cubs || 3–4 || Lester (9–3) || Niese (6–4) || Rondon (12) || 41,424 || 33–35 ||L4
|- bgcolor="ffbbbb"
| 69 || June 19 || @ Cubs || 5–10 || Hendricks (5–6) || Taillon (1–1) || — || 41,024 || 33–36 ||L5
|- bgcolor="ccffcc"
| 70 || June 20 || Giants || 1–0 || Locke (6–5) || Bumgarner (8–3) || Melancon (20) || 27,906 || 34–36 ||W1
|- bgcolor="ffbbbb"
| 71 || June 21 || Giants || 4–15 || Cueto (11–1) || Boscán (1–1) || — || 27,729 || 34–37 ||L1
|- bgcolor="ffbbbb"
| 72 || June 22 || Giants || 6–7 || Law (3–1) || Hughes (0–1) || Casilla (15) || 33,747 || 34–38 ||L2
|- bgcolor="ffbbbb"
| 73 || June 23 || Giants || 3–5 || Suarez (3–1) || Niese (6–5) || Casilla (16) || 29,986 || 34–39 ||L3
|- bgcolor="ccffcc"
| 74 || June 24 || Dodgers || 8–6 || Feliz (2–0) || Tepesch (0–1) || Melancon (21) || 28,226 || 35–39 ||W1
|- bgcolor="ccffcc"
| 75 || June 25 || Dodgers || 6–1 || Locke (7–5) || Maeda (6–5) || — || 33,590 || 36–39 ||W2
|- bgcolor="ccffcc"
| 76 || June 26 || Dodgers || 4–3 || Kuhl (1–0) || Kershaw (11–2) || Melancon (22) || || 37–39 ||W3
|- bgcolor="ffbbbb"
| 77 || June 27 || Dodgers || 4–5 || Kazmir (6–3) || Liriano (4–8) || Jansen (22) || 26,925 || 37–40 ||L1
|- bgcolor="ffbbbb"
| 78 || June 28 || @ Mariners || 2–5 || Iwakuma (7–6) || Niese (6–6) || Cishek (18) || 24,836 || 37–41 ||L2
|- bgcolor="ccffcc"
| 79 || June 29 || @ Mariners || 8–1 || Taillon (2–1) || Miley (6–4) || — || 25,477 || 38–41 ||W1
|-

|- bgcolor="ccffcc"
| 80 || July 1 || @ Athletics || 7–3 || Locke (8–5) || Gray (3–7) || — || 15,710 || 39–41 ||W2
|- bgcolor="ccffcc"
| 81 || July 2 || @ Athletics || 4–2 || Nicasio (6–6) || Coulombe (1–1) || Melancon (23) || 28,846 || 40–41 ||W3
|- bgcolor="ccffcc"
| 82 || July 3 || @ Athletics || 6–3 || Liriano (5–8) || Mengden (1–4) || Melancon (24) || 21,831 || 41–41 ||W4
|- bgcolor="ccffcc"
| 83 || July 4 || @ Cardinals || 4–2 ||  Niese (7–6) || Martinez (7–6) || Feliz (1) || 41,850 || 42–41 ||W5
|- bgcolor="ccffcc"
| 84 || July 5 || @ Cardinals || 5–2 || Nicasio (7–6) || Leake (5–7) || Melancon (25) || 41,444 || 43–41 ||W6
|- bgcolor="ccffcc"
| 85 || July 6 || @ Cardinals || 7–5 || Schugel (2–2) || Broxton (1–1) || Melancon (26) || 42,693 || 44–41 ||W7
|- bgcolor="ffbbbb"
| 86 || July 7 || @ Cardinals || 1–5 || Wainwright (8–5) || Glasnow (0–1) || — || 42,144 || 44–42 ||L1
|- bgcolor="ccffcc"
| 87 || July 8 || Cubs || 8–4 || Feliz (3–0) || Arrieta (12–4) || Melancon (27) || 35,904 || 45–42 ||W1
|- bgcolor="ccffcc"
| 88 || July 9 || Cubs || 12–6 || Caminero (1–2) || Warren (3–2) || Hughes (1) || 37,796 || 46–42 ||W2
|- bgcolor="ffbbbb"
| 89 || July 10 || Cubs || 5–6 || Strop (2–2) || Watson (1–3) || Rondon (14) || 37,998 || 46–43 ||L1
|- style="text-align:center; background:#bbcaff;"
| colspan="10" | 87th All-Star Game in San Diego, California
|- bgcolor="ffbbbb"
| 90 || July 15 || @ Nationals || 1–5 || Strasburg (13–0) || Liriano (5–9) || — || 36,982 || 46–44 ||L2
|- bgcolor="ffbbbb"
| 91 || July 16 || @ Nationals || 0–6 || Roark (9–5) || Cole (5–5) || — || 38,861 || 46–45 ||L3
|- bgcolor="ccffcc"
| 92 || July 17 || @ Nationals || 2–1 (18) || Niese (8–6) ||  Pérez (2–3) || — || 32,755 || 47–45 ||W1
|- bgcolor="ccffcc"
| 93 || July 19 || Brewers || 3–2 || Melancon (1–1) || Thornburg (3–4) || — || 27,106 || 48–45 ||W2
|- bgcolor="ffbbbb"
| 94 || July 20 || Brewers || 5–9 || Torres (2–1) || Locke (8–6) || — || 36,717 || 48–46 ||L1
|- bgcolor="ccffcc"
| 95 || July 21 || Brewers || 5–3 || Liriano (6–9) || Garza (1–4) || Melancon (28) || 35,978 || 49–46 ||W1
|- bgcolor="ffbbbb"
| 96 || July 22 || Phillies || 0–4 || Eflin (3–3) || Cole (5–6) || — || 33,703 || 49–47 ||L1
|- bgcolor="ccffcc"
| 97 || July 23 || Phillies || 7–4 || Nicasio (8–6) || Nola (5–9) || Melancon (29) || 35,802 || 50–47 ||W1
|- bgcolor="ccffcc"
| 98 || July 24 || Phillies || 5–4 || Feliz (4–0) || Ramos (1–1) || Melancon (30) || 32,439 || 51–47 ||W2
|- bgcolor="ffbbbb"
| 99 || July 26 || Mariners || 4–7 || Hernandez (5–4) || Liriano (6–10) || Cishek (14) || 30,969 || 51–48 ||L1
|- bgcolor="ccffcc"
| 100 || July 27 || Mariners || 10–1 || Cole (6–6) || Paxton (3–5) || — || 35,483 || 52–48 ||W1
|- bgcolor="ffbbbb"
| 101 || July 29 || @ Brewers || 1–3 || Guerra (7–2) || Brault (0–1) || Jeffress (25) || 29,442 || 52–49 ||L1
|- bgcolor="ffbbbb"
| 102 || July 30 || @ Brewers || 3–5 || Anderson (6–10) || Taillon (2–2) || Jeffress (26) || 36,663 || 52–50 ||L2
|- bgcolor="ffbbbb"
| 103 || July 31 || @ Brewers || 2–4 || Garza (2–4) || Liriano (6–11) || Jeffress (27) || 32,405 || 52–51 ||L3
|- bgcolor="ffbbbb"

|- bgcolor="ccffcc"
| 104 || August 2 || @ Braves || 5–3 || Cole (7–6) || Foltynewicz (4–5) || Watson (1) || 20,633 || 53–51 ||W1
|- bgcolor="ffbbbb"
| 105 || August 3 || @ Braves || 4–8 || Whalen (1–0) || Locke (8–7) || — || 19,281 || 53–52 ||L1
|- bgcolor="ffbbbb"
| 106 || August 4 || @ Braves || 2–5 || Cervenka (1–0) || Rivero (0–4) || Johnson (7) || 20,527 || 53–53 ||L2
|- bgcolor="ccffcc"
| 107 || August 5 || Reds || 3–2 || Watson (2–3) || Ohlendorf (5–7) || — || 28,882 || 54–53 ||W1
|- bgcolor="ccffcc"
| 108 || August 6 || Reds || 5–3 || Nova (8–6) || Bailey (1–1) || Watson (2) || 34,259 || 55–53 ||W2
|- bgcolor="ffbbbb"
| 109 || August 7 || Reds || 3–7 || Straily (7–6) || Cole (7–7) || — || 32,947 || 55–54 ||L1
|- bgcolor="ccffcc"
| 110 || August 9 || Padres || 6–4 || Kuhl (2–0) || Perdomo (5–6) || Watson (3) || 30,269 || 56–54 ||W1
|- bgcolor="ffbbbb"
| 111 || August 10 || Padres || 0–4 || Jackson (3–2) || Vogelsong (1–2) || — || 29,623 || 56–55 ||L1
|- bgcolor="ccffcc"
| 112 || August 11 || Padres || 4–0 || Taillon (3–2) || Friedrich (4–8) || Watson (4) || 32,071 || 57–55 ||W1
|- bgcolor="ccffcc"
| 113 || August 12 || @ Dodgers || 5–1 || Nova (9–6) || Stripling (3–4) || Watson (5) || 47,438 || 58–55 ||W2
|- bgcolor="ffbbbb"
| 114 || August 13 || @ Dodgers || 4–8 || Urias (3–2) || Cole (7–8) || Jansen (35) || 40,563 || 58–56 ||L1
|- bgcolor="ccffcc"
| 115 || August 14 || @ Dodgers || 11–3 || Kuhl (3–0) || Anderson (0–1) || — || 43,468 || 59–56 ||W1
|- bgcolor="ccffcc"
| 116 || August 15 || @ Giants || 8–5 || Vogelsong (2–2) || Moore (7–9) || — || 41,850 || 60–56 ||W2
|- bgcolor="ccffcc"
| 117 || August 16 || @ Giants || 4–3 || Bastardo (1–0) || Law (4–2) || Watson (6) || 41,185 || 61–56 ||W3
|- bgcolor="ccffcc"
| 118 || August 17 || @ Giants || 6–5 || Nicasio (9–6) || Cain (4–8) || Watson (7) || 41,139 || 62–56 || W4 
|- bgcolor="ffbbbb"
| 119 || August 19 || Marlins || 5–6 || Wittgren (4–2) || Feliz (4–1) || Rodney (22) || 32,357 || 62–57 || L1
|- bgcolor="ffbbbb"
| 120 || August 20 || Marlins || 1–3 || Phelps (7–6) || Kuhl (3–1) || Rodney (23) || 37,820 || 62–58 || L2
|- bgcolor="ffbbbb"
| 121 || August 21 || Marlins || 2–3 || Ureña (2–4) || Vogelsong (2–3) || Rodney (24) || 28,616 || 62–59 || L3
|- bgcolor="ffbbbb"
| 122 || August 22 || Astros || 1–3 || Fister (12–8) || Taillon (3–3) || Giles (4) || 24,017 || 62–60 || L4
|- bgcolor="ccffcc"
| 123 || August 23 || Astros || 7–1 || Nova (10–6) || Musgrove (1–2) || — || 28,760 || 63–60 ||W1
|- bgcolor="ffbbbb"
| 124 || August 24 || Astros || 4–5 || McHugh (8–10) || Cole (7–9) || Giles (5) || 23,717 || 63–61 || L1
|- bgcolor="ccffcc"
| 125 || August 25 || @ Brewers || 3–2 (10) || Bastardo (2–0)|| Torres (2–3) || Watson (8) || 20,296 || 64–61 ||W1 
|- bgcolor="ccffcc"
| 126 || August 26 || @ Brewers || 5–3 || Vogelsong (3–3) || Garza (4–6) || Watson (9) || 25,474 || 65–61 || W2
|- bgcolor="ccffcc"
| 127 || August 27 || @ Brewers || 9–6 || Locke (9–7) || Boyer (1–3) || Feliz (2) || 35,925 || 66–61 || W3 
|- bgcolor="ccffcc"
| 128 || August 28 || @ Brewers || 3–1 || Nova (11–6) || Anderson (7–11) || Watson (10) || 37,583 || 67–61 || W4 
|- bgcolor="ffbbbb"
| 129 || August 29 || @ Cubs || 7–8 (13) || Zastryzny (1–0) || Locke (9–8) || — || 38,951 || 67–62 || L1
|- bgcolor="ffbbbb"
| 130 || August 30 || @ Cubs || 0–3 || Hendricks (13–7) || Kuhl (3–2) || Chapman (11) || 38,174 || 67–63 || L2
|- bgcolor="ffbbbb"
| 131 || August 31 || @ Cubs || 5–6 || Hammel (14–7) || Vogelsong (3–4) || Chapman (12) || 38,137 || 67–64 || L3
|-

|- bgcolor="ffbbbb"
| 132 || September 2 || Brewers || 0–1 || Boyer (2–3) || Taillon (3–4) || Thornburg (7) || 21,772 || 67–65 || L4
|- bgcolor="ffbbbb"
| 133 || September 3 || Brewers || 4–7 ||  Torres (3–3) || Feliz (4–2) || Thornburg (8) || 26,637 || 67–66 || L5
|- bgcolor="ffbbbb"
| 134 || September 4 || Brewers || 0–10 || Anderson (8–11) || Brault (0–2) || — || 25,318 || 67–67 || L6
|- bgcolor="ffbbbb"
| 135 || September 5 || Cardinals || 6–12 || Wainwright (10–8) || Kuhl (3–3) || — || 26,297|| 67–68 || L7
|- bgcolor="ffbbbb"
| 136 || September 6 || Cardinals || 7–9 || Mayers (1–1) || Watson (2–4) || Oh (16) || 20,369|| 67–69 || L8
|- bgcolor="ccffcc"
| 137 || September 7 || Cardinals || 4–3 || Williams (1–0) || Reyes (1–1) || Watson (11) || 21,523 || 68–69 || W1
|- bgcolor="ccffcc"
| 138 || September 8 || Reds || 4–1 || Nova (12–6) || Straily (11–8) || — || 24,520 || 69–69 || W2
|- bgcolor="ffbbbb"
| 139 || September 9 || Reds || 3–4 || Iglesias (3–1) || Watson (2–5) || — || 20,369|| 69–70 || L1
|- bgcolor="ffbbbb"
| 140 || September 10 || Reds || 7–8 || Smith (3–1) || Williams (1–1) || Cingrani (17) || 25,918 || 69–71 || L2
|- bgcolor="ffbbbb"
| 141 || September 11 || Reds || 0–8 || Finnegan (9–10) || Vogelsong (3–5) || — || 26,744 || 69–72 || L3
|- bgcolor="ffbbbb"
| 142 || September 12 || @ Phillies || 2–6 || Hellickson (11–9) ||  Cole (7–10) || — || 15,514 || 69–73 || L4 
|- bgcolor="ccffcc"
| 143 || September 13 || @ Phillies || 5–3 || Rivero (1–4) || Gomez (3–4) || Watson (12) || 16,190 || 70–73 || W1 
|- bgcolor="ffbbbb"
| 144 || September 14 || @ Phillies || 2–6 || Thompson (2–5) || Brault (0–3) || Gomez (37) || 16,112 || 70–74 || L1 
|- bgcolor="ccffcc"
| 145 || September 15 || @ Phillies || 15–2 || Kuhl (4–3) || Eickhoff (10–14) || — || 15,247 || 71–74 || W1 
|- bgcolor="ccffcc"
| 146 || September 16 || @ Reds || 9–7 (10) || Bastardo (3–0) || Cingrani (2–5) || Watson (13) || 20,238 || 72–74 || W2 
|- bgcolor="ccffcc"
| 147 || September 17 || @ Reds || 10–4 || Taillon (4–4) || DeSclafani (8–4) || LeBlanc (1) || 17,226 || 73–74 || W3 
|- bgcolor="ccffcc"
| 148 || September 17 || @ Reds || 7–3 || Nicasio (10–6) || Finnegan (9–11) || — || 24,397 || 74–74 || W4
|- bgcolor="ffbbbb"
| 149 || September 18 || @ Reds || 4–7 || Straily (13–8) || Nova (12–7) || — || 19,597 || 74–75 || L1 
|- bgcolor="ccffcc"
| 150 || September 20 || @ Brewers || 6–3 || Hughes (1–1) || Garza (5–8) || Watson (14) || 20,829 || 75–75 || W1
|- bgcolor="ccffcc"
| 151 || September 21 || @ Brewers || 4–1 || Kuhl (5–3) || Nelson (8–15) || Watson (15) || 25,482 || 76–75 || W2 
|- bgcolor="ffbbbb"
| 152 || September 22 || @ Brewers || 1–3 || Anderson (9–11) || Vogelsong (3–6) || Thornburg (12) || 24,582 || 76–76 || L1
|- bgcolor="ccffcc"
| 153 || September 23 || Nationals ||  6–5 (11) || LeBlanc (4–0) || Petit (3–5) || — || 29,513 || 77–76 || W1
|- bgcolor="ffbbbb"
| 154 || September 24 || Nationals || 1–6 || López (4–3) || Nova (5–2) || — || 30,137 || 77–77 || L1
|- bgcolor="ffbbbb"
| 155 || September 25 || Nationals || 7–10 || Kelley (3–2) || Rivero (1–5) || Melancon (43) || 28,924 || 77–78 || L2
|- bgcolor="ffbbbb"
| 156 || September 26 || Cubs || 2–12 || Hendricks (16–8) || Kuhl (5–4) || — || 20,519 || 77–79 || L3
|- bgcolor="ffbbbb"
| 157 || September 27 || Cubs || 4–6 || Lackey (11–8) || Vogelsong (3–7) || Peña (1) || 22,454 || 77–80 || L4
|- bgcolor="ccffcc"
| 158 || September 28 || Cubs || 8–4 || Taillon (5–4) || Arrieta (18–8) || — ||  || 78–80 || W1
|- bgcolor=D3D3D3
| 159 || September 29 || Cubs || 1–1 (6) || colspan="3"|Game called (inclement weather)(game not made up; tie does not count in record)|| 19,991 || 78–80|| —
|- bgcolor="ffbbbb"
| 160 || September 30 || @ Cardinals || 0–7 || Martinez (16–9) || Glasnow (0–2) || — || 43,070 || 78–81 || L1
|-

|- bgcolor="ffbbbb"
| 161 || October 1 || @ Cardinals || 3–4 || Siegrist (6–3) || Rivero (1–6) || Oh (19) || 43,328 || 78–82 || L2
|- bgcolor="ffbbbb"
| 162 || October 2 || @ Cardinals || 4–10 || Broxton (4–2) || Nicasio (10–7) || — || 44,615 || 78–83 || L3
|-

|- style="text-align:center;"
| Legend:       = Win       = Loss       = PostponementBold = Pirates team member

Roster

Opening Day lineup

Disabled lists

15-day disabled list

60-day disabled list

Notable achievements

Awards
Rawlings Gold Glove Award
Starling Marte, OF 

2016 Major League Baseball All-Star Game
Mark Melancon, P, reserve
Starling Marte, OF, reserve (replacing Yoenis Céspedes)

National League Player of the Week Award
Jung-ho Kang (September 5–11)
Sean Rodriguez (September 12–18)

Sporting News NL All-Star Team
Starling Marte, OF

Statistics

Players
Updated as of games on October 2, 2016
Batting
Note: G = Games played; AB = At bats; H = Hits; Avg. = Batting average; HR = Home runs; RBI = Runs batted in

Pitching
Note: G = Games pitched; IP = Innings pitched; W = Wins; L = Losses; ERA = Earned run average; SO = Strikeouts

Legend
– Stats reflect time with the Pirates only.
† – Denotes player was acquired during season.
‡ – Denotes player was relinquished during season.
 – Injured reserve.
 – Qualified for batting title (3.1 plate appearances per team game) or ERA title (1 inning pitched per team game)

Transactions
The Pirates were involved in the following transactions during the 2016 season:

Trades

Free agents

Waivers

Signings

Other

Draft picks

Farm system

LEAGUE CHAMPIONS: Bradenton

References

External links
 2016 Pittsburgh Pirates at Baseball Reference
 Pittsburgh Pirates official site

Pittsburgh Pirates seasons
Pittsburgh Pirates
Pittsburgh Pirates